This is a list of wars that began between 1000 and 1499 (last war ended in 1504). Other wars can be found in the historical lists of wars and the list of wars extended by diplomatic irregularity.

1000–1099

1100–1199

1200–1299

1300–1399

1400–1499

References

2nd-millennium conflicts
11th century-related lists
12th century-related lists
13th century-related lists
14th century-related lists
15th century-related lists
1000-1499
Warfare of the Middle Ages